Thai News Agency is news agency and subsidiary of MCOT. Founded on 16 June 1977, Thai News Agency has main responsibilities about production, gather, analyze and report news for on air in radio, television, electronics, internet, social media and other.

25 April 2012 Thai News Agency bought video wall long 25 meters. Yingluck Shinawatra open using New video wall.

Cooperation with foreign news agencies 
Thai News Agency cooperation with foreign agency such as

Television 
 CNN
 CCTV
 NHK
 TV5Monde
 RAI
 STRFT
 VTV

Radio 
 ABC
 BBC
 VOA
 CNN Radio [1]

See also 
 MCOT
 Channel 9 MCOT HD

References

External links 
 เว็บเพจสำนักข่าวไทย ภาษาไทย ในเว็บไซต์
 เว็บเพจสำนักข่าวไทย ภาษาอังกฤษ ในเว็บไซต์ บมจ.อสมท
 เว็บเพจ บริการสำนักข่าวไทยออนไลน์ ในเว็บไซต์ บมจ.อสมท
 https://www.youtube.com/channel/UC3SaG2jCoWuI50eC41OJ53Q ช่อง YouTube สำนักข่าวไทย บมจ.อสมท

News agencies based in Thailand
Organizations established in 1977
1977 establishments in Thailand